Katt-Isbel Field is a baseball park located in Seguin, TX and home to the Texas Lutheran Bulldogs of the American Southwest Conference. The venue holds a capacity of 650.

References

Baseball venues in Texas
College baseball venues in the United States